General elections were held in Luxembourg on 15 December 1968. The Christian Social People's Party (CSV) remained the largest party, winning 21 of the 56 seats in the Chamber of Deputies.

Following the elections the CSV dropped their previous coalition partners, the Luxembourg Socialist Workers' Party, and formed a new government with the Democratic Party. This led to the creation of the second Werner-Schaus government.

Results

References

Chamber of Deputies (Luxembourg) elections
Luxembourg
General
History of Luxembourg (1945–present)
Luxembourg